A by-election was held in the Dáil Éireann Meath East constituency in Ireland on Wednesday, 27 March 2013 following the death of the Fine Gael Teachta Dála (TD) Shane McEntee on 21 December 2012.

The Electoral (Amendment) Act 2011 stipulates that a by-election in Ireland must be held within six months of a vacancy occurring. The electorate of Meath East at the 2011 general election was 64,873.

Fine Gael candidate Helen McEntee, daughter of the deceased, was elected on the third count.

Candidates
On 22 February 2013, both Fianna Fáil and Sinn Féin selected their candidates for the by-election. Fianna Fáil selected Senator Thomas Byrne, a former TD for the constituency. Sinn Féin selected Darren O'Rourke, a medical scientist who works as a health policy advisor to Caoimhghín Ó Caoláin TD. The Workers' Party announced that Seamus McDonagh, a spokesperson for the local Campaign Against the Household and Water Taxes (CAHWT) campaign, would contest the election.

On 5 March, the Green Party selected Seán Ó Buachalla as its candidate, a youth club development officer, while Direct Democracy Ireland announced that Ben Gilroy would be contesting the election. On 7 March, Fine Gael selected Helen McEntee, daughter of Shane McEntee, as its candidate. On 9 March, the Labour Party selected Meath County Councillor Eoin Holmes.

There were four independent candidates: Charlie Keddy, Mick Martin, Gerard O'Brien and Jim Tallon.

RTÉ debate
An RTÉ Prime Time television debate held on 25 March featured candidates from the four main parties: Fine Gael, Labour Party, Fianna Fáil and Sinn Féin. The other candidates were excluded, including the Green Party, DDI and Workers' Party candidates. Workers' Party candidate Seamus McDonagh said the Prime Time editor had no "consistent criteria" for this decision, and criticised the lack of an invitation to even sit in the audience despite having, he said, the support of several TDs. DDI's Ben Gilroy said RTÉ "just basically ignored us completely."

Result

Fine Gael candidate Helen McEntee finished first on the first count with 9,356 votes (38.5%), while Fianna Fáil's Thomas Byrne came second with 8,002 votes (32.9%). McEntee was elected on the third count with 11,473 votes. The Labour Party candidate Eoin Holmes, got 4.6%, down from 21.0% that Labour received at the 2011 general election, and finished fifth behind new party Direct Democracy Ireland.

It is the first time since 1975 that Fine Gael have won a by-election while in government.

See also
List of Dáil by-elections
Dáil constituencies

References

External links
Meath East by-election, 2013 at The Journal

2013 in Irish politics
2013 elections in the Republic of Ireland
31st Dáil
By-elections in the Republic of Ireland
Elections in County Meath
RTÉ controversies
March 2013 events in Europe